State Route 190 (SR 190) is a  state highway that runs west-east mostly through F. D. Roosevelt State Park and Roosevelt's Little White House Historic Site. It is known as Scenic Heights Road and Pine Mountain Highway. It connects the Pine Mountain area and Manchester. It parallels the Pine Mountain Range for much of its length.

Route description
SR 190 begins at an intersection with US 27/SR 1, south of Pine Mountain, in Harris County. It heads northeast and meets SR 354 within F.D. Roosevelt State Park. After leaving the park, it enters Meriwether County and Roosevelt's Little White House Historic Site, just north of Dowdell's Knob. On the southeast edge of the site, it intersects US 27 Alt./SR 85 Alt. (Whitehouse Highway). It enters Talbot County and parallels the northwestern border of the county. Finally, it crosses back into Meriwether County and enters Manchester. It heads northeast until it meets its eastern terminus, an intersection with SR 41/SR 85 (Broad Street).

SR 190 is not part of the National Highway System, a system of roadways important to the nation's economy, defense, and mobility.

At its eastern terminus lies Georgia State Patrol's Post 34, also known as the Manchester Post. SR 190 is used to access several broadcast towers including WFDR-FM, WFDR (AM), and WVFJ-FM.  On top of the mountain, SR 190 passes over State Route 354 on a historic bridge built by the Civilian Conservation Corps. This route also contains many lookout points for photography.

Major intersections

See also

References

External links

 Georgia Roads (Routes 181 - 200)

190
Transportation in Harris County, Georgia
Transportation in Meriwether County, Georgia
Transportation in Talbot County, Georgia